In 1990, at the age of fourteen, folk artist Cara Dillon formed a traditional Irish music band with school friends called Óige. In 1995 she joined folk super-group Equation and signed a record deal with WEA.

Dillon's solo career began in 2001 with the release of her debut album Cara Dillon. Signed to Rough Trade Records for her first three, Dillon released her fourth solo album in 2009 on her own label, Charcoal Records. Included in the list below, in addition to her own, are guest appearances on other artists' releases as well as collaborations and compilations.

Studio albums

Singles and promos 
"Man in the Rain" (credited to: Mike Oldfield featuring Cara) (1998)
"Black Is the Colour" (2001)
"Blue Mountain River" (2001)
"High Tide" (2003)
"There Were Roses" (2003)
"Everywhere" (2004)
"Never in a Million Years" (2006)
"This Time" / "I Wish You Well" (2006)
"If I Prove False" (2008)
"The Hill of Thieves" (2009)
"Come Dream A Dream" (2012) "Disney Dreams!"
"Shotgun Down The Avalanche" (2014)
"Bright Morning Star" (2014)

DVDs 
The Redcastle Sessions (2008)
Cara Dillon Live At The Grand Opera House (September 2009)

Collaborations and guest appearances 
Óige - Live (1994)
Equation - Return To Me (1996) (2003)
Óige - Bang On (1996)
Mike Oldfield - Tubular Bells III (1998) - Vocals on Man in the Rain. 
Ghostland - Interview With The Angel (2001)
Equation - First Name Terms (2002)
Seth Lakeman - The Punch Bowl (2002)
Tommy Flemming - Voice Of Hope (2005)
Dickon Hinchcliffe with Cara Dillon - Did You Ever Wonder Why? (2005)
Keeping Mum - Music From The Motion Picture (2005)
Judge Jules - Proven Worldwide (US) (2006)
Seth Lakeman - Freedom Fields (2006)
Judge Jules - Ordinary Day - UK Dance Singles Chart #3 (2006)
Judge Jules - Proven Worldwide (UK) - UK Indie Chart #40 (2006)
Anjunabeats Worldwide 1 - Various (UK) - 2Devine (2006)
Cara Dillon vs. 2Devine - Black Is The Colour (UK) - Promo CD (2006)
Cara Dillon vs. 2Devine - Black Is The Colour (UK) - Promo Vinyl (2006)

Other 
Roots & Branch 1: A New World (2000)
Ashley Hutchings - Street Cries (2001)
Billy Connolly's World Tour of England, Ireland & Wales - DVD Bonus (2004)
Other Voices: Songs Of A Room 2 (2004)
Various - Rubber Folk (2006)
2006 Radio Ballads - Thirty Years Of Conflict (2006)
2006 Radio Ballads - The Songs Of The Radio Ballads (2006)
The Transatlantic Sessions Series 3 DVD (various artists) (2007)

References

Discographies of Irish artists
Folk music discographies